Velinov (masculine) or Velinova (feminine) is a Bulgarian surname. Notable people with the surname include:

Georgi Velinov (born 1957), Bulgarian footballer and manager
Georgi Velinov (1911-?), Bulgarian cyclist
Iskra Velinova (born 1953), Bulgarian rower
Ivaylo Velinov (born 1986), Bulgarian footballer
Kristiyan Velinov (born 1991), Bulgarian footballer
Ventsislav Velinov (born 1981), Bulgarian footballer

Bulgarian-language surnames